Vedea can refer to:

 Vedea, a river of Romania
 Vedea, Teleorman, a commune in Romania
 Vedea, Giurgiu, a commune in Romania
 Vedea (programming language), a visualization programming language from Microsoft